Vítor Coelho de Almeida (September 22, 1899 - July 21, 1987), more known as "Padre Vítor Coelho", was a Brazilian Redemptorist priest and catechist. He was most famous for his preaching methods and his devotion to the patron saint of Brazil, Our Lady of Aparecida.

Coelho was born in Sacramento, Minas Gerais, the son of Leão Coelho de Almeida and Maria Sebastiana Alves Moreira. He entered in the Santo Afonso seminary in Aparecida, completed his studies in Germany and was ordained a priest on 1923.

His beatification process is underway and is led by Dom Darci José, the Auxiliary Bishop of Aparecida.

See also
Our Lady of Aparecida
Roman Catholicism in Brazil

References

1899 births
1987 deaths
Redemptorists
20th-century Brazilian Roman Catholic priests
People from Minas Gerais
Venerated Catholics by Pope Francis
20th-century venerated Christians